"We'll do it live" or "Fuck it, we'll do it live" is a quote from "Bill O'Reilly Goes Nuts", an outtake from the show Inside Edition that went viral in 2008. The terms may also refer to:

Fuck It, We'll Do It Live, a 2008 album by American horror punk musician Wednesday 13
Boing, We'll Do It Live!, a 2012 album by rock supergroup The Aristocrats
 We'll Do It Live, a 2011 album by acoustic/bluegrass band Infamous Stringdusters
F*** It! We'll Do It Live - Volume 1 (2012), album by American instrumental trio Consider the Source
F*** It! We'll Do It Live - Volume 2 (2013), album by Consider the Source